Peterborough Regional Health Centre (PRHC) is a hospital located in Peterborough, Ontario, Canada. The hospital was established in January 1999, and it is a combination of the former Peterborough Civic Hospital and St. Joseph's Health Centre. All acute care services were provided at 1 Hospital Drive (the former Civic Hospital), located in the Central-West part of the city, while chronic, rehabilitation and palliative care services, along with some out-patient medical and surgical services, were provided from the 384 Rogers Street site (the former St. Joseph's Health Centre) located in the "East City" or Ashburnham neighbourhood of Peterborough. Effective June 2008 all services of the PRHC (excluding some Outpatient Mental Health services and the Women's Health Care Centre) moved into a new  hospital building located directly in front of the old Civic Hospital, across from the Nicholls Building, which continued to house some Outpatient Mental Health services (including the Schizophrenia Clinic, Family & Youth Clinic and Psychiatric Services for the Elderly) until 2010.

In late 2010, all patient services, including the Women's Health Care Centre, were moved into the new hospital building. Demolition of the Nicholls building began in fall 2011 and was completed in December 2011.

The hospital is affiliated with the Queen's University School of Medicine, and is a training site for the Family Medicine Residency Program.

Service area
The City of Peterborough (pop. 81,032 (2016)), located in Central-East Ontario, is one of the largest cities between the Greater Toronto Area (GTA) and Ottawa, and is the business, culture, education, and health care centre of a greater region stretching from the Counties of Northumberland (south) to Haliburton (north), and the City of Kawartha Lakes (west) to Hastings County (east). The region covers a huge geographic area, and is home to a population of approximately 300,000.

As a regional hospital, the PRHC receives many urgent and emergency transfers of seriously ill or injured patients from smaller hospitals in (and outside) its catchment area, including hospitals in Bancroft, Barry's Bay, Belleville, Campbellford, Cobourg, Haliburton, Lindsay, Minden Hills and Trenton.

Staff and volunteers
PRHC is the region's largest employer with a staff of approximately 2,400 and about 400 physicians with various privileges. The hospital has more than 600 volunteers.

Program and service areas
 Cancer Care (oncology and radiation services)
 Cardiac (including Interventional Cardiac Catheterisation, Telemetry, CCU and Pacemaker Insertion)
 Critical Care Medicine (ICU, Rapid Response Team, Plasmapheresis, Hemodialysis)
 Diagnostic Imaging Services (including General Radiology and Fluoroscopy, CT, MRI, Ultrasound)
 Dialysis
 Emergency Services (including Base Hospital and District Stroke Centre)
 General Medicine
 Geriatrics
 Internal Medicine (Cardiology, Dermatology, Endocrinology, Gastroenterology, Nephrology, Neurology, Rheumatology)
 Interventional Radiology
 Laboratory Medicine and Pathology
 Long-term Care
 Medical Oncology (including Outpatient Cancer Clinic)
 Mental Health Services (including Inpatient, Outpatient Clinics)
 Paediatrics (including Inpatient, Paediatric surgery)
 Perinatal & Women's Health (including Gynaecology, Labour & Delivery, Maternity, Basinettes, Level II Nursery, Women's Health Centre)
 Pharmacy
 Surgery (General, Gynaecology, Ophthalmology, Orthopaedics, Otolaryngology/ENT, Plastics, Urology, Vascular)

Statistics 2016 - 2017
 Admitted 19,087 inpatients
 83,319 visits to the Emergency Department
 215,850 outpatient visits
 30,451 Mental Health & Addictions outpatient visits
 4,999 radiation treatment visits
 Performed 125,133 Diagnostic Imaging procedures
 Delivered 1,572 babies into the world
 Performed 22,034 surgical procedures
 Performed 942 hip and knee procedures
 Completed 1.65 million laboratory tests
 Completed 2024 cardiac procedures
 Administered 2.3 million doses of medication

Controversy

In November 2014 Ken Tremblay, the hospital’s CEO was walked out of the building. Alan Wotherspoon speaking for the board of directors refused to say whether Tremblay quit or was fired and would only say that it was a human resources issue.  Two weeks later three more executives at the hospital were also no longer working there, including Arnel Schiratti, Cathy van Leipsig and Michael Moore. The hospital refused to say whether they were fired or quit, though stated it was unrelated. The hospital advised the community that it was in the process of reviewing its finances. A later audit of the hospital’s financial records revealed that a total of $57 million was accounted for incorrectly on the hospital's balance sheet, rather than on its statement of operations as usable revenue. Members of the local community and the Peterborough Health Coalition were upset at the secrecy surrounding events at the hospital and the fact budget cuts had been taking place for years.

In October 2012 the lawyer heading the effort to start a class-action lawsuit over the breach of privacy of more than 280 patients at Peterborough Regional Health Centre said he will seek to launch the action before the end of the year. Several of the affected patients have spoken publicly about having their medical records accessed by hospital staff who weren’t involved in treating them. Some have said they had been the victims of earlier breaches at the hospital last year, and that they received letters in the fall informing them of the situation.

Helipad

The hospital has a ground level helipad located next to the hospital. A short walkway provides access from the helipad to transfer patients to the emergency room.

References

External links
 Official website

Hospitals in Ontario
Hospitals established in 1999
Heliports in Ontario
Certified airports in Ontario
Buildings and structures in Peterborough, Ontario
1999 establishments in Ontario